The 1936–37 United States collegiate men's ice hockey season was the 43rd season of collegiate ice hockey in the United States.

Regular season

Standings

References

1936–37 NCAA Standings

External links
College Hockey Historical Archives

College